Karl Liebknecht is a two-part East German film series directed by Günter Reisch, about the German Communist leader Karl Liebknecht (1871–1919), starring Horst Schulze in the part as Liebknecht, and Lyudmila Kasyanova as Sophie Liebknecht.
The first film, from 1965, Karl Liebknecht - Solange Leben in mir ist.
The second film, from 1972, Karl Liebknecht - Trotz alledem!

Cast
 Horst Schulze: Karl Liebknecht
 Ludmila Kasjanowa: Sophie Liebknecht
 Rita Krips: Vera Liebknecht
 Mikhail Ulyanov: Frolow
 Albert Hetterle: Paul Schreiner
 Erika Dunkelmann: Milda Schreiner
 Jutta Hoffmann: Käthe Schreiner
 Stefan Lisewski: Werner Gutjahr
 Albert Garbe: Albin Holzer
 Fred Delmare: Waldemar Lehmann
 Wolfgang Ostberg: Ernst Lemke
 Hans Hardt-Hardtloff: Tischler
 Horst-Tanu Margraf: Professor Wendler
 Zofia Rysiówna: Rosa Luxemburg
 Erich Mirek: Wilhelm Pieck
 Siegfried Weiss: Franz Mehring
 Hans Finohr: Georg Ledebour
 Adolf Peter Hoffmann: Gustav Noske
 Otto Lang: Philipp Scheidemann
 Harald Halgardt: Kaiser Wilhelm II.
 Werner Dissel: Theobald von Bethmann Hollweg
 Otto Roland: Minister of War
 Alfred Müller: Gustav Krupp von Bohlen und Halbach
 Arthur Jopp: Albert Südekum
 Peter Sturm: Ober

See also
Ernst Thälmann (film)

External links

1965 films
1972 films
East German films
1960s German-language films
Films set in Berlin
German biographical films
Biographical films about revolutionaries
Films set in the 1910s
German film series
Cultural depictions of Karl Liebknecht
Cultural depictions of Rosa Luxemburg
Cultural depictions of Wilhelm II
1960s German films
1970s German films